The Faith And Hope League (FHL) is a Christian political party in Taiwan formed in 2015. The party emerged from the fifth "Conference of  National Affairs Forum of Taiwan Pastors" hold by Taiwan Christian Union. The party is led by presidium, consisting of Chen Chih-hung, a pastor of Taiwan Lutheran Church; Joanna Lei, former legislator of New Party; Benson Wang, a businessman and member of Taichung Banner Church; Chung Tung-chieh, pastor of Sanmin Church, a church of the Taiwan Lutheran Church in Kaohsiung; and Chang Hsin-yi, pastor of City Spring of Life Full Gospel Church.

The FHL nominated 16 candidates in the 2016 general election, 10 for Constituencies and 6 party list, but failed to gain any seats.

Platform 
The FHL was formed in order to oppose the legalization of same-sex marriage via its counterproposal, a referendum petition that advocated "family protection" by only allowing the husband-wife relationship, consanguinity and familial ethics, and cannot be passed without a national vote.

History 
The party was established on 6 September 2015, which is for running the proportional seats in the Legislative Yuan.

Leadership

Presidium Terms

Election

Taiwan legislative election, 2016

See also 
 Same-sex marriage in Taiwan
 Christian right
 List of political parties in Taiwan
 Politics of the Republic of China
 Referendums in Taiwan

References

External links 

 Faith and Hope League on Facebook 

2015 establishments in Taiwan
Political parties in Taiwan
Organizations based in Taipei
Political parties established in 2015